Mississippi Highway 436 (MS 436) is a state highway in western Mississippi. The route starts at Eastside Lake Washington Road in Glen Allan and travels eastward. The road intersects MS 1 in Hampton and turns northeastward. It ends near Percy at U.S. Route 61 (US 61). MS 436 was designated in 1957, along a road from US 61 to a point near the Washington–Sharkey county line. The route was extended westward to Glen Allan along a state-maintained road in 1958, and also eastward to Belzoni via a county road in 1967. The route east of US 61 was decommissioned by 1967.

Route description

All of the route is located in Washington County. MS 436 is legally defined in Mississippi Code § 65-3-3, and all of it is maintained by the Mississippi Department of Transportation (MDOT), as part of the Mississippi State Highway System.

MS 436 starts at Eastside Lake Washington Road, near the eastern shore of Lake Washington and the unincorporated area of Glen Allan. The route travels eastward through farmland to MS 1 in Hampton, and it crosses Steele Bayou afterwards. The road turns northeastwards at Grace Road and borders the Yazoo National Wildlife Refuge. The road travels along Steele Bayou and it intersects the entrance to the refuge at Beargarden Road. At Woodsaw Mill Road, MS 436 turns east and away from the refuge. Past the second intersection with Beargarden Road, the road shifts south towards the Washinghton–Sharkey county line. The route travels on the county line, ending at US 61 at a three-way junction near Percy.

History
Around 1933, a gravel road was constructed from MS 1 near Glen Allan to US 61 near the Washington–Sharkey county line, and it was later paved by 1948. The section from Glen Allan to Hampton also became part of MS 1. MS 1 was realigned in 1952, no longer routing through Glen Allen. By 1957, a new paved road was constructed from US 61 near Hollandale to a point near the Washington–Humphreys county line, and it was designated as MS 436. About one year later, MS 436 was extended westward to Glen Allan, connecting to MS 1. A county-maintained county road in Humphreys County was added to the route by 1960, connecting the route to US 49W near Belzoni. By 1967, the section east of US 61 was removed from the route, and the route has not changed significantly since.

Major intersections

See also

Mississippi Highway 444
Mississippi Highway 450
Mississippi Highway 454

References

External links

Yazoo National Wildlife Refuge

436
Transportation in Washington County, Mississippi